Ana Boulter (born 29 April 1976) is a British television presenter. She attended the Minster School in Southwell, Nottinghamshire, then Nottingham Trent University, where she studied broadcast journalism. She presented on CBBC between 1998 and 2001, the BBC regional programme Inside Out, and briefly on Sky News in 2005–6.

References

External links
 TV Room Plus
 

1976 births
Alumni of Nottingham Trent University
Living people
English television presenters